Southern California Institute of Architecture (SCI-Arc) is a private architecture school in Los Angeles, California. Founded in 1972, SCI-Arc was initially regarded as both institutionally and artistically avant-garde and more adventurous than traditional architecture schools based in the United States. It consists of approximately 500 students and 80 faculty members, some of whom are practicing architects. It is based in the quarter-mile long former Santa Fe Freight Depot in the Arts District in downtown Los Angeles and also offers community events such as outreach programs, free exhibitions, and public lectures.

History 

SCI-Arc was founded in 1972 in Santa Monica by Ray Kappe, Shelly Kappe, Ahde Lahti, Thom Mayne, Bill Simonian, Glen Small, and James Stafford, a group of faculty from the Department of Architecture at California State Polytechnic University, Pomona. The founders were frustrated with the treatment of students and faculty members by administrators at Cal Poly and wanted to approach the subject from a more experimental perspective than traditional schools offered.

Originally called the New School, SCI-Arc was based on the concept of a "college without walls," and it remains one of the few independent architecture schools in the world. Initially, instead of academic hierarchies the School favored a horizontal relationship between professors and students, who took responsibility for their own course of study. Kappe, who had founded the Cal Poly department, became the new school's first director and served in that position until 1987. He was awarded the AIA/ACSA Topaz Medal for excellence in architecture education in 1990.

Kappe was succeeded as director by Michael Rotondi, one of SCI-Arc's original students. Neil Denari became director in 1997; Eric Owen Moss served as director from 2002–2015; Hernán Díaz Alonso was appointed Director and Chief Executive Officer effective Sept 1, 2015. Díaz Alonso has been a faculty member at SCI-Arc since 2001. He is known for championing the school's push toward a digital future and, prior to his appointment as Director, has served as the school's Graduate Programs Chair since 2010.

Although SCI-Arc was once unaccredited and its finances unstable—Moss joked, "We used to be considered one step ahead of the IRS, one step ahead of creditors"—the school is now fully accredited, and its finances improved to the point that SCI-Arc was able to pay $23.1 million to buy its campus building in 2011. "The main thing is to figure out a way for SCI-Arc to keep growing without losing its character and pedigree," Díaz Alonso said in an interview following his appointment as director.

Campus 

The open nature of SCI-Arc's program is reflected in the series of industrial buildings that have housed the school, where students are encouraged to design and construct their own studio environments, and occasionally full-scale projects. The school has been based in three locations—the first (1972-1992) a small industrial building in Santa Monica and later moved into the second, a much larger (architecturally unique concrete post & beam) industrial building (1992-2000) in Marina del Rey.

In 2001, it moved to its current home, the 60,000-square-foot 1907 Santa Fe Freight Depot designed by Harrison Albright on the eastern edge of Downtown Los Angeles. When SCI-Arc arrived, the building was a stripped-down concrete shell. Today the building is on the National Register of Historic Places and the school has become an anchor for the city's Arts District.

The school conducts design projects that engage with under-served members of the community. To these ends, SCI-Arc has been awarded a $400,000 grant by ArtPlace to develop two on-campus public performance/lecture spaces, as well as development for a third public venue in the surrounding arts district. Across the street, "One Santa Fe," a 438-unit apartment complex designed by Michael Maltzan Architecture (MMA) opened in 2014.

Academics 
SCI-Arc offers undergraduate and graduate degree programs accredited by the National Architectural Accrediting Board and the WASC Senior College and University Commission, including a five-year Bachelor of Architecture (B.Arch) program, a 3-year Master of Architecture (M.Arch 1) open to applicants who hold a bachelor's degree or equivalent in any field of study, and a 2-year Master of Architecture (M.Arch 2) open to applicants with a prior undergraduate degree in architecture.

In addition to its undergraduate and graduate programs, SCI-Arc offers four one-year postgraduate programs in fields including architectural technologies, entertainment and fiction, design of cities, and theory and pedagogy.

SCI-Arc's undergraduate and graduate programs culminate in two public events in which students present their thesis projects to renowned critics from around the world, including Peter Cook, Greg Lynn, and Pritzker Prize recipient Thom Mayne. "SCI-Arc has long been one of this country’s best experimental labs in which designers speculate about the future of the human-made environment, and its thesis projects are its calling cards."

Public programs 
A recent program and exhibition, "LA in Wien/Wien in LA," investigated the architecture of Los Angeles and Vienna and their respective influences on one another in over the last century. It brought together six esteemed international architects—Hitoshi Abe, Peter Cook, Eric Owen Moss, Thom Mayne, Peter Noever, and Wolf Prix of Coop Himmelb(l)au—to share their perspectives and experiences in a discussion led by Anthony Vidler. The full scope of SCI-Arc public programs includes lectures, exhibitions, faculty talks and other opportunities for interaction between the school and the community.

Notable faculty 
The following list contains both current and former faculty:

Ann Bergren
Walead Beshty
Aaron Betsky
Mike Davis
Benjamin H. Bratton
Neil Denari
Hernan Diaz Alonso
Frank Gehry
Graham Harman
Laurie Hawkinson
Kahlil Joseph
Ray Kappe
Shelly Kappe
Elena Manferdini
Thom Mayne
Lucy McRae
David Mohney
Timothy Morton
Eric Owen Moss
Michael Rotondi
Marcelo Spina
Michael Stock
Patrick Tighe
Tom Wiscombe
Liam Young
Mimi Zeiger

Notable alumni

Barbara Bestor
Shigeru Ban
David Randall Hertz
Sue Courtenay
Wanda Dalla Costa
Jon Drezner
Jeffrey Eyster
Gordon Kipping
Ola-dele Kuku
Cara Lee
Karen M'Closkey
David Montalba
Abinadi Meza
Rocio Romero
Mimi Zeiger

References

External links 

 Official website

 
Architecture schools in California
Universities and colleges in Los Angeles
Downtown Los Angeles
 01
Schools accredited by the Western Association of Schools and Colleges
Educational institutions established in 1972
1972 establishments in California
History of Santa Monica, California
Architects from Los Angeles
Art in Greater Los Angeles
Organizations based in Santa Monica, California
Private universities and colleges in California
Southern California Institute of Architecture alumni